The Hurricane Kid is a 1925 American silent Western film directed by Edward Sedgwick and starring Hoot Gibson. It was produced and released by Universal Pictures.

Plot
As described in a review in a film magazine, the Hurricane Kid (Gibson) falls in love with one young woman after another. When he breaks his arm, Joan (Nixon) takes him to her father Colonel Langdon's (Mackley) ranch. Foreman Lafe Baxter (Steele) is jealous, and the Kid whips him in a fist fight for insulting Joan. The Colonel and ranchman Hezekiah Potts (Todd) stage a horse race and bet their ranches. The Kid tames Pal, a wild mare of great speed which the Colonel had captured and then turned loose, and the Kid wins the race on that horse. Joan, who has mocked him for playing the gallant, now relents.

Cast

See also
 Hoot Gibson filmography

Preservation
A print of The Hurricane Kid is listed as being held by the Danish Film Institute.

References

External links
 
 

1925 films
Films directed by Edward Sedgwick
Universal Pictures films
1925 Western (genre) films
American black-and-white films
Silent American Western (genre) films
1920s American films
Films with screenplays by Richard Schayer